The history of the People's Liberation Army began in 1927 with the start of the Chinese Civil War and spans to the present, having developed from a peasant guerrilla force into the largest armed force in the world.

Historical background
Throughout the centuries, two tendencies have influenced the role of the military in national life, one in peacetime and the other in times of upheaval. In times of peace and stability, military forces were firmly subordinated to civilian control. The military was strong enough to overcome domestic rebellions and foreign invasion, yet it did not threaten civilian control of the political system. In times of disorder, however, new military leaders and organizations arose to challenge the old system, resulting in the militarization of political life. When one of these leaders became strong enough, he established a new political order ruling all China. After consolidating power, the new ruler or his successors subordinated the military to civilian control once again.

Since the 1960s, China had considered the Soviet Union the principal threat to its security; lesser threats were posed by long standing border disputes with Vietnam and India. China's territorial claims and economic interests made the South China Sea an area of strategic importance to China. Although China sought peaceful reunification of Taiwan with the mainland China, it did not rule out the use of force against the island if serious internal disturbances, a declaration of independence, or a threatening alliance occurred.

Before the founding of the People's Republic of China

The divisions of the "Chinese Workers' and Peasants' Red Army" (中國工農紅軍) were named according to historical circumstances, sometimes in a nonconsecutive way. Early Communist units often formed by defection from existing Kuomintang forces, keeping their original designations. Moreover, during the Chinese Civil War, central control of separate Communist-controlled enclaves within China was limited, adding to the confusion of nomenclature of Communist forces. By the time of the 1934 Long March, numerous small units had been organized into three unified groups, the First Front Red Army (紅一方面軍/红一方面军/Hóng Yī Fāngmiàn Jūn), the Second Front Red Army (紅二方面軍/红二方面军/Hóng Èr Fāngmiàn Jūn) and the Fourth Front Red Army (紅四方面軍/红四方面军/Hóng Sì Fāngmiàn Jūn), also translated as "First Front Red Army", "Second Front Red Army" and "Fourth Front Red Army". 

Mao's military thought grew out of the Red Army's experiences in the late 1930s and early 1940s and formed the basis for the "people's war" concept, which became the doctrine of the Red Army and the PLA. In developing his thought, Mao drew on the works of the Chinese military strategist Sun Zi (4th century BC) and Soviet and other theorists, as well as on the lore of peasant uprisings, such as the stories found in the classical novel Shuihu Zhuan (Water Margin) and the stories of the Taiping Rebellion. Synthesizing these influences with lessons learned from the Red Army's successes and failures, Mao created a comprehensive politico-military doctrine for waging revolutionary warfare. People's war incorporated political, economic, and psychological measures with protracted military struggle against a superior foe. As a military doctrine, people's war emphasized the mobilization of the populace to support regular and guerrilla forces; the primacy of men over weapons, with superior motivation compensating for inferior technology; and the three progressive phases of protracted warfare—strategic defensive, strategic stalemate, and strategic offensive (see Mobile Warfare). During the first stage, enemy forces were "lured in deep" into one's own territory to overextend, disperse, and isolate them. The Red Army established base areas from which to harass the enemy, but these bases and other territory could be abandoned to preserve Red Army forces. In addition, policies ordered by Mao for all soldiers to follow, the Eight Points of Attention, instructed the army to avoid harm to or disrespect for the peasants, regardless of the need for food and supplies. This policy won support for the Communists among the rural peasants. 

On January 15, 1949, the Communist Party Central Military Commission decided to reorganise the regional armies of the PLA into four field armies.

People's Republic of China

Border disputes in the 1970s 
In January 1974, the PLA saw action in the South China Sea following a long-simmering dispute with the Republic of Vietnam (South Vietnam) over the Paracel Islands. The PLA successfully seized control of three disputed islands in a naval battle and a subsequent amphibious assault.

A Sino-Vietnamese War revealed specific shortcomings in military capabilities and thus provided an additional impetus to the military modernization effort. The border war, the PLA's largest military operation since the Korean War, was essentially a limited, offensive, ground-force campaign. The war had mixed results militarily and politically. Although the numerically superior Chinese forces penetrated about fifty kilometers into Vietnam, the PLA was not on good terms with its supply lines and was unable to achieve a decisive victory in the war. Both China and Vietnam claimed victory.

Military modernization in the 1980s 

In 1981, the PLA conducted its largest military exercise in North China since the founding of the People's Republic of China. In 1985, Deng Xiaoping announced that the PLA would demobilize 1 million troops.

On the other hand, border battles and skirmishes continued throughout the 1980s.

Chronology

The Ten-Year Civil War (1927–1937) 
 1927: Nanchang Uprising / Autumn Harvest Uprising / Guangzhou Uprising
 Kuomintang campaigns against the Jiangxi Soviet:
 November 1930 to December 1931: First Encirclement Campaign against Jiangxi Soviet
 April to May 1931: Second Encirclement Campaign against Jiangxi Soviet
 July 1931: Third Encirclement Campaign against Jiangxi Soviet
 December 1932 to March 1933: Fourth Encirclement Campaign against Jiangxi Soviet
 September 1933 to October 1934: Fifth Encirclement Campaign against Jiangxi Soviet
 1934–1936: The Long March, a strategic retreat to avoid destruction by the Nationalist armies of Chiang Kai-shek
 1935: Battle at the Luding Bridge

Second Sino-Japanese War (1937–1945) 
 1937 to 1945: Second Sino-Japanese War
 September 25, 1937: The Battle of Pingxingguan
 January 1940: The New Fourth Army Incident
 August–December 1940: The Hundred Regiments Offensive

Chinese Civil War (1945–1950) 
 1945 to 1950: Chinese Civil War against the Kuomintang:
September 10, 1945 to October 12, 1945 – Shangdang Campaign
October 22, 1945 to November 2, 1945 – Handan Campaign
December 17, 1946 to April 1, 1947 – Linjiang Campaign
May 13, 1947 to July 1, 1947 – Summer Offensive of 1947 in Northeast China
September 14, 1947 to November 5, 1947 – Autumn Offensive of 1947 in Northeast China
October 10, 1947 - Eighth Route Army and New Fourth Army reorganised into the People's Liberation Army
December 15, 1947 to March 15, 1948 – Winter Offensive of 1947 in Northeast China
May 23, 1948 to October 19, 1948 – Siege of Changchun
September 12, 1948 to November 12, 1949 – Liaoshen Campaign
October 7, 1948 to November 15, 1948 – Battle of Jinzhou
November 6, 1948 to January 10, 1949 – Huaihai Campaign
November 29, 1948 to January 31, 1949 – Pingjin Campaign
October 25, 1949 to October 27, 1949 – Battle of Kuningtou
November 3, 1949 to November 5, 1949 – Battle of Denbu Island
March 3, 1950 to March 3, 1950 – Battle of Nan'ao Island
May 12, 1950 to June 2, 1950 – Shanghai Campaign
May 25, 1950 to August 7, 1950 – Wanshan Archipelago Campaign
August 9, 1950 to August 9, 1950 – Battle of Nanpéng Island

People's Republic of China (since 1949)

Taiwan Strait (aftermath of the civil war) 
 1952 to 1996: Taiwan Strait conflicts with the Republic of China (Taiwan):
April 11, 1952 to April 15, 1952 – Battle of Nanri Island
September 20, 1952 to October 20, 1952: Battle of Nanpēng Archipelago
 August 1954 to May 1955: The First Taiwan Strait Crisis
January 18, 1955 to January 20, 1955: Battle of Yijiangshan Islands
 August 23 to October 6, 1958: Second Taiwan Strait Crisis
 July 21, 1995 to March 23, 1996: Third Taiwan Strait Crisis

1949–1979 

 October 19, 1950: The Battle of Chamdo
 December 1951 to 1953: Korean War (under the official banner of the Chinese People's Volunteers, although they are PLA regulars)
 1956 to 1959: Suppression of the Tibetan resistance movement
 October 20, 1962 to November 21, 1962: Sino-Indian War
 September 11, 1967 to October 1, 1967: Nathu La and Cho La clashes
 1969 to 1978: Sino-Soviet border conflict
 January 17 to January 19, 1974: Battle of Hoang Sa, a sea battle with the Republic of Vietnam Navy near the disputed Xisha Islands
 February 17 to March 16, 1979: Sino-Vietnamese War

Military modernization (1980s) 
 September 14–18, 1981: North China Military Exercise, the largest military exercise since the founding of People's Republic of China in 1949
 1985: Deng Xiaoping downsized the PLA significantly and demobilized around 1 million soldiers
 1986: Border skirmishes with Vietnam
 May 20 to June 9, 1989: People's Liberation Army at Tiananmen Square protests of 1989 the Tiananmen Square protests of 1989.
 April 1, 2001: Hainan Island incident, a Chinese People's Liberation Army Navy jet intercepting a US Navy reconnaissance aircraft collides with the US plane. The Chinese pilot is marked missing in action (but assumed dead), while the crew of the US reconnaissance is detained by Chinese authorities, and released shortly after.

See also 

Military history of China (pre-1911)
Naval history of China
Revolution in Military Affairs (RMA)
People's Republic of China military reform

References

Citations

Sources

Further reading 
 Blasko, Dennis J. The Chinese Army Today: Tradition and Transformation for the 21st Century (2012) excerpt and text search
 Cole, Bernard D. The Great Wall at Sea: China's Navy in the Twenty-First Century (2nd ed., 2010)
 Fisher, Richard. China's Military Modernization: Building for Regional and Global Reach (2010) excerpt and text search
 Fravel, M. Taylor. Active Defense: China's Military Strategy since 1949 (Princeton University Press, 2019) online reviews
 Jencks, Harlan W. From Muskets to Missiles: Politics and Professionalism in the Chinese Army 1945-1981 Westview, 1982
 Nelson, Harvey W. The Chinese Military System: An Organizational Study of the Chinese People's Liberation Army  Boulder
 
 Whitson, William W. with Chen-Hsia Huang. The Chinese High Command: A History of Communist Military Politics 1927-71 Palgrave MacMillan, 1973

People's Liberation Army
Military history of the People's Republic of China
Military history of the Republic of China (1912–1949)